Ždánice may refer to places in the Czech Republic:

Ždánice (Hodonín District), a town in the South Moravian Region
Ždánice Forest, a mountain range named after the town
Ždánice (Kolín District), a municipality and village in the Central Bohemian Region
Ždánice (Žďár nad Sázavou District), a municipality and village in the Vysočina Region
Ždánice, a village and part of Vilémov (Havlíčkův Brod District) in the Vysočina Region
Staré Ždánice, a municipality and village in the Pardubice Region